Amolops granulosus is a species of frog in the family Ranidae that is endemic to China.

Its natural habitats are temperate forests and rivers.
It is not considered threatened by the IUCN.

References

Amphibians of China
granulosus
Endemic fauna of China
Amphibians described in 1961
Taxonomy articles created by Polbot